Didier Ernst (born 15 September 1971) is a former Belgian football player who played as a defender.

While at La Louvière he helped them win the 2002–03 Belgian Cup.

References

External links
 
 

1971 births
Living people
Belgian Pro League players
R.W.D.M. Brussels F.C. players
Association football defenders
People from Dison
Belgian footballers
R.C.S. Verviétois managers
Belgian football managers
Belgium international footballers
Footballers from Liège Province